Víctor Barberá Romero (born 20 August 2004) is a Spanish professional footballer who plays as a striker for Barcelona Atlètic.

Club career
Barberá is a youth product of Sant Gabriel, and moved to Damm in 2019. The following year in 2020 he joined Barcelona's youth academy, and in his first year was the top scorer of the División de Honor Juvenil de Fútbol with 19 goals.

He was promoted to Barça Atlètic for the beginning of the 2022–23 season. He made his senior debut with Barça Atlètic in a 0–0 Primera Federación tie with CD Alcoyano on 4 September 2022.

International career
Barberá was called up to the Spain U19s in September 2022.

Playing style
Barberá is adept at pouncing on balls in the box and rebounds. An intelligent player, he often appears behind the defense and is a strong finisher. He's quick and can play out wide, but prefers to stay in the opponent's box. He has earned comparison in playstyle to Robert Lewandowski.

Career statistics

Club

References

External links
 
 
 

2004 births
Living people
Footballers from Barcelona
Spanish footballers
Association football forwards
Primera Federación players
FC Barcelona Atlètic players
Spain youth international footballers